Charles "Lefty" Bell was a baseball pitcher in the Negro leagues. He played with the Homestead Grays during their 1948 Negro World Series championship season.

References

External links
 and Seamheads 

Homestead Grays players
Year of birth missing
Year of death missing
Baseball pitchers